Cnissostages mastictor is a species of moth in the family Arrhenophanidae. It is found from Costa Rica to Peru.

The length of the forewings is 18.5-27.5 mm for males and 28–23 mm for females.

External links
fFamily Arrhenophanidae

Arrhenophanidae
Moths described in 1951